Iwa Boman (real name: Rut Iva Elisabet Boman Söderberg; born 23 November 1944 in Sundsvall (but grew up in Ånge)) is a Swedish actress and playwright.

Boman studied at the Swedish National Academy of Mime and Acting 1969–72 and after that she started working at Stockholm City Theatre.

Selected filmography
1982 – Mamma (1982)
1986 – Morrhår och ärtor
1986 – The Brothers Mozart
1999–2000 – Nu är det nu (TV)
1995 – Älskar, älskar inte
1995 – Nattens barn (TV)
2002 – Skeppsholmen (TV series)
2006 – Att göra en pudel
2009 – Superhjältejul (TV)

References

External links

Iwa Boman on Swedish Film Database
Iwa Boman on Stockholm City Theatre's website

Swedish film actresses
Swedish stage actresses
Swedish television actresses
20th-century Swedish dramatists and playwrights
1944 births
Living people
People from Sundsvall
Swedish women dramatists and playwrights